The Singing Kettle: Singalong Songs From Scotland  is a record containing 17 children’s songs. This is The Singing Kettle's first recording to be widely distributed outside the United Kingdom. The songs are performed by Cilla Fisher, Artie Trezise and Gary Coupland. Also joining in on this recording are Kevin MacLeod and Jane Fisher.

Performer credits 
Artie Trezise - Guitar, Vocals, Arranger, Compilation, Compilation Mastering, Photography, Producer 
Cilla Fisher - Vocals
Gary Coupland - Keyboards, Harmony Vocals, Saxophone
Kevin MacLeod - Vocals, Voices
Jane Fisher - Vocals 
Norman Chalmers - Vocals, Whistle (Human)
Gregor Reid - Autoharp
John McGlynn - Drums
Stuart Anderson - Accordion, Keyboards
Allan Barty - Fiddle, Mandolin
Lindsay Porteous - Jew's-Harp
Mark Murphy - Bass

Production credits 
Roy Ashby - Engineer
Robin Morton -Engineer
Dan Sheehy - Production Supervisor
Pete Reiniger -Compilation Mastering
Mary Monseur - Production Coordination
Carla Borden - Editorial Assistant
Stephanie Smith - Producer, Liner Notes, Annotation, Compilation
D. A. Sonneborn - Production Supervisor 
John W. Young - Photography
Caroline Brownell - Design, Illustrations

Track listing
"Three Craws"
"Aiken Drum"
"Picnic Treat" (P. Trezise/Gary Coupland)
"Ten in the Bed"
"No Pyjamas On" (Ewan McVicar)
"Buy Me a Banana"
"Down on the Funny Farm (P. Trezise/Gary Coupland)
"Bunny Fou Fou" (Artie Trezise)
"The Green Grass Grew All Around"
"Air Guitar" (P. Kennedy)
"Opposites"
"Apples and Bananas"
"Five Wee Monkeys
"The Ants Went Marching"
"My Boy's a Cowboy
"Boa Constrictor" (Shel Silverstein)
"Friends Like You" (Jane Fisher/P. Trezise/Gary Coupland)

References

External links 
Singalong Songs from Scotland; Smithsonian Folkways
Singalong Songs from Scotland; artistdirect.com

Smithsonian Folkways albums
2003 compilation albums